Pleckstrin homology domain containing A8 is a protein that in humans is encoded by the PLEKHA8 gene.

References

Further reading